Phillip J. Barrish is a literary scholar, currently the Tony Hilfer Professor of American and British Literature at University of Texas at Austin, and also a published author.

Education
Cornell University, Ph.D. in English and American Literature, 1991
Cornell University, M.A. in English and American Literature, 1987
The University of Pennsylvania, Simultaneous M.A. in English and B.A., Magna Cum Laude, with Honors in English, 1985

References

Year of birth missing (living people)
Living people
University of Texas at Austin faculty
University of Pennsylvania School of Arts and Sciences alumni
Cornell University alumni
21st-century American historians
21st-century American male writers
American male non-fiction writers